The Delegation Apostolic of Mesopotamia, Kurdistan, and Armenia was the Papal representative who administered the Latin Rite diocese of Baghdad and oversaw various Eastern Rite dioceses among the Catholic community.

References

Catholic Church in Iraq
Catholic Church in Armenia